Josep Maria de Porcioles i Colomer (Amer, 15 July 1904 – Vilassar de Dalt, 3 September 1993) was the mayor of Barcelona, Catalonia, Spain for sixteen years, from 15 March 1957 until 11 May 1973, during the reign of caudillo Franco. His long administration is associated with the rapid economic and industrial growth of the city during Spain's desarrolisme and unplanned urban sprawl in Barcelona to accommodate the hundreds of thousands of immigrants attracted to the city from southern Spain. He was finally forced to retire in 1973 due to neighbourhood protests over the poor quality of the housing in the new areas and lack of social provision, and the speculation and corruption associated with the mayor. He is interred in the Montjuïc Cemetery in Barcelona.

References

Politicians from Catalonia
Mayors of Barcelona City Council
1904 births
1993 deaths
Francoism in Catalonia
FET y de las JONS politicians